Saint-Gérard-le-Puy is a commune in the Allier department in Auvergne-Rhône-Alpes in central France.

Geography
Much of the local rock is limestone common in the Auvergne, known as indusial, because of the cases, or indusiae, of the larvæ of Phryganea (resembling caddis-flies), which have been encrusted, as they lay, by hard travertine (a white or light-coloured concretionary limestone, usually hard and semi-crystalline, deposited from water holding lime in solution).

The area is rich in fossils, notably birds from the Miocene era.  See, for example, Cheneval J (1984), Les oiseaux aquatiques (Gaviiformes à Ansériformes) du gisement aquitanien de Saint-Gérard-le-Puy (Allier} (The aquatic birds (Galliformes to Anseriformes) of the aquitanian deposits of Saint-Gérard-le-Puy (Allier}.

History
A Roman road runs by the town.  It was a fortified village in the Middle Ages, deriving strategic importance from its location on the route from Moulins to Lyon.

It belonged to the seigneurie of Montluçon at the beginning of the 13th century but when the le Bourbonnais (part of the Massif Central essentially co-terminous with the modern Allier) became a Duchy in 1327 it passed into of the hands of the Bourbons.

During the French Revolution it was known as Puy-Redan.  In 1832, Saint-Etienne-de-Ciernat and Saint-Etienne-du-Bas were joined to the commune and, in 1833, Saint-Allyre-de-Valence followed.

Administration
List of successive mayors
 1991–current: Xavier Cadoret (before his naturalization: Karim Kadouri) (mayor since 1991, re-elected in 1995 (77%), in 2001 (84%), in 2008, in 2014 and in 2020).

Population

Its inhabitants are known as Gérandass.

Sights
 The 11th-century Romanesque church of St Julien
 Its tower is shown at:;
 Château of Saint-Gérard: The manor is 15th-century;
 Manor of Gondailly is 15th-century with 19th-century reconstruction;
 A dodecahedral washhouse is under restoration;
 The James Joyce Museum is located in a room adjoining the town library.

The Joyce connection
In December 1939 James Joyce, his wife, Nora, and son, Giorgio, made an extended visit to the town to see Giorgio's son, Stephen, a pupil at the bilingual school there.

In February 1940 they were visited by Samuel Beckett.

Personal problems, and the imminent German occupation, persuaded them to move to their final port of call, neutral Switzerland, where they arrived on 14 December 1940. A year later, Joyce died in Zurich. His obituary published in Time can be read online .

The memory of Joyce has been celebrated for many years in Saint-Gerard, in particular with "le Jour d'Ulysse ."

Personalities
 James Joyce (b. Dublin, Ireland 2 February 1882) - (d. Zurich, Switzerland 13 January 1941).
 Alphonse Milne-Edwards 13 October 1836 - 21 April 1900.

See also
Communes of the Allier department

References

External links

(All sites in French, unless otherwise indicated)
  Financial Data  for Saint-Gérard-le-Puy from the Ministry of the Economy, Finances and Industry
 Saint-Gérard-le-Puy on the Cassini map

Communes of Allier
Allier communes articles needing translation from French Wikipedia